Mark II (died 17 April 819) was the 49th Coptic Patriarch of Alexandria from 26 January 799 until his death.

During his reign, around 810, the schismatic Barsanuphians were brought back into the Coptic fold. Mark baptized their leaders, George and Abraham, at the monastery of Saint Mina and consecrated them as orthodox bishops (albeit without dioceses). Mark later appointed George to the diocese of Tanbudha and Abraham to that of Atripe. Mark also rebuilt and reconsecrated one of the former churches of the Barsanuphians.

Notes

Bibliography

8th-century Coptic Orthodox popes of Alexandria
9th-century Coptic Orthodox popes of Alexandria
819 deaths